The Men's Allam British Open 2012 is the men's edition of the 2012 British Open Squash Championships, which is a PSA World Series event Platinum (Prize money : 150 000 $). The event took place at the O2 in London, England from 14 May to 20 May. Nick Matthew won his third British Open trophy, beating Ramy Ashour in the final.

Prize money and ranking points
For 2012, the prize purse was $150,000. The prize money and points breakdown is as follows:

Seeds

Draw and results

See also
2012 Men's World Open Squash Championship
2012 Women's British Open Squash Championship

References

External links
PSA British Open 2012 website
British Open 2012 official website

Men's British Open Squash Championships
Men's British Open
Men's British Open
Men's British Open
Men's British Open
Squash competitions in London